Guest of Darkness (Spanish: El huésped de las tinieblas) is a 1948 Spanish historical drama film directed by Antonio del Amo and starring Carlos Muñoz and Pastora Peña. It portrays the life of the nineteenth century romanticist poet and writer Gustavo Adolfo Bécquer.

Cast
 Manuel Aguilera 
 Fernando Aguirre 
 Valeriano Andrés 
 Manuel Arbó 
 Mario Berriatúa 
 Tomás Blanco 
 Irene Caba Alba 
 María Carrizo 
 Carlos Casaravilla 
 Félix Fernández 
 Elda Garza 
 Julia Lajos 
 Arturo Marín 
 Mari Paz Molinero 
 Carlos Muñoz 
 Nicolás D. Perchicot 
 Pastora Peña 
 Joaquín Roa 
 Conrado San Martín

References

Bibliography 
 Mira, Alberto. The A to Z of Spanish Cinema. Rowman & Littlefield, 2010.

External links 
 

Spanish historical drama films
1940s historical drama films
1948 films
1940s Spanish-language films
Films directed by Antonio del Amo
Films set in the 19th century
Films scored by Jesús García Leoz
Spanish black-and-white films
1948 drama films
1940s Spanish films